Orembai or Arombai is a type of plank boat from the Maluku Islands of Eastern Indonesia. It is mainly used for fishing and transport. This vessel is used as far as Batavia, where in the 17th century it became popular to go out "orembaaien" on an evening rowing on the river or city canals.

Etymology 

The name orembai or arumbai is probably comes from the adapted Malay word rembaya, which means state ship, with Portuguese prefix 'o'. In other variants of language they are also called orembaai, arambaai, arobail, arubai, arubaillo, arumbai, arumbae, oranbai, oranbaik, orang-bays, and corambay. Martin says that the name orembai is a contraction for orang baik ("good man") and comes from the era of the Hongi voyages, i.e. these boats are the opposite of Hongitocht kora kora, which is a war vessel.

Description 
It is widest at the middle, tapering gradually towards both ends. It usually has three strakes attached to a narrow keel which in turn is joined to a stem-post at each end. The stempost is broader and lower than the sternpost. Traditional orembai uses the tanja or lete sail, but more modern orembai adopted European-style rigging, such as pinisi rig and schooner rig. Orembai is built using planks, joined with lashed-lug construction.

The orembai is very similar to the mon of the North Solomons. It also resembles the kora kora, but differs in that, like most large Austronesian ships, the orembai does not have outriggers (likely due to their inherent stability).

Gallery

See also 
 Lambo (boat)
 Padewakang
 Pencalang
 Karakoa
Knabat bogolu

References

Sailboat types
Indonesian inventions
Austronesian ships
Boats of Indonesia